Brides  (translit. Nyfes) is a 2004 Greek film directed by Pantelis Voulgaris. The film stars Victoria Haralabidou and Damian Lewis, and the photography is by Giorgos Arvanitis. Set in 1922, is the story of a mail order bride, one of 700, aboard the SS King Alexander, who falls in love with an American photographer. She is bound for her new husband, in Chicago, he is on his way home to a failed marriage. The film was entered into the 27th Moscow International Film Festival.

The film was supported by Martin Scorsese, who is credited as executive producer.

Cast and characters
Damian Lewis as Norman Harris
Victoria Haralabidou as Niki Douka
Andréa Ferréol as Emine
Evi Saoulidou as Haro
Dimitris Katalifos as Captain
Irini Iglesi as Miss Kardaki
Evelina Papoulia as Marion
Steven Berkoff as Karaboulat

Reception

Awards
winner: 
2004: Greek State Film Awards for Best Film
2004: Greek State Film Awards for Best Actress (Victoria Haralabidou)
2004: Greek State Film Awards for Best Supporting  Actress (Evi Saoulidou)
2004: Greek State Film Awards for Best Music (Stamatis Spanoudakis)
2004: Greek State Film Awards for Best Cinematography (Yorgos Arvanitis)
2004: Greek State Film Awards for Best Scenography
2004: Greek State Film Awards for Best Editing
2004: Greek State Film Awards for Best Make up
2004: Greek State Film Awards for Best Sound
2004: Greek State Film Awards for Costume Design

nominated:
2005: Moscow International Film Festival for Golden St. George

References

External links

Nyfes at Greek Center of Film
Nyfes at Cine

2000s English-language films
English-language Greek films
2000s Greek-language films
2000s Russian-language films
2004 films
2004 drama films
Films set in 1922
Films set in Greece
Films shot in Crete
Films directed by Pantelis Voulgaris
Greek drama films
2004 multilingual films
Greek multilingual films